"Feel My Soul" is the first major label single by the Japanese artist Yui. It was released February 23, 2005, under Sony Records. This was Yui's first major single. Her previous single, "It's Happy Line", was released under Leaflet Records. The single was used as the opening theme to the J-Drama Fukigen na Gene. During its first week on Oricon, the single reached a peak of 8th place and would go on to become the 95th highest selling single of 2005.

"Feel My Soul" was also included in the album called, "Hit Style" which was distributed by Sony Music Entertainment (Japan). The album was released on 1 January 2006. It has 2 discs which have the hit songs from various artists. "Feel My Soul" is included in the second disc.

Track listing

Oricon Sales Chart (Japan)

References

2005 singles
Yui (singer) songs
Songs written by Yui (singer)
Japanese television drama theme songs
2005 songs